Erkki Rönnholm (18 September 1923 – 15 September 2010) was a Finnish middle-distance runner. He competed in the men's 800 metres at the 1952 Summer Olympics.

References

1923 births
2010 deaths
Athletes (track and field) at the 1952 Summer Olympics
Finnish male middle-distance runners
Olympic athletes of Finland
Place of birth missing